Ichchhemotir Gappo ( the story of ichchhemoti) is a 2015 Bengali film directed by Atanu Hazra, Adinath Das and Kaushik Sengupta, and produced by Pradip Churiwal and Saikat Mitra for Macneill Media Pvt Ltd. The music is composed by Kalyan Sen Barat. It is Macneill Media's second film, after Durbin.

Storyline 
Ichchemotir Gappo is a film about human relationships and how they evolve over time. Contemporary dance and music form an integral part of the movie. Kalyan Sen Barat takes us back to the nostalgic Salil Chowdhury era of orchestration, and the voices of Rupankar and Srikanto Acharya are a throwback to the golden period of Bangla cinema. Saswata Chatterjee and Tanushree Chakraborty break away to perform in roles completely anew.

The story revolves around the budding relationship between its two central characters, Ichche and Neel, despite their contrasting personalities. Ichche is a free-spirited dansusee, with a completely different take on the dialectics of love and relationships compared to Neel. Although attracted to each other, their love remains unrequited, and, to complicate matters, a fashion photographer in Bijoy is also attracted to Ichche and has designs to make her into a big star. In the beginning of the story, Tagore's Uttaran remains in the background.

Ichche belongs to dance group headed by a male dancer named Srijan, who gives stellar performances of male heroes, despite the fact that he is also homosexual. His love remains unrequited until he meets Subhash. Between the dance school and music school, there is a small tea shop where a little boy named Madhav supplies tea to both schools. A small-time film producer, played by Sadhan, and a man named Madhav are also enamored by Ichche, and in their own ways show their love for her.

Cast 
 Saswata Chatterjee as Nil 
 Tanusree Chakraborty as Ichchhe 
 Aparajita Auddy as Smriti 
 Saheb Bhattacharya as Rupam 
 Biswajit Chakraborty as Bijoy 
 Dwijen Bandopadhyay as Sadhan 
 Koneenica Banerjee as Sanji 
 Biswanath Basu as Kanchan
 Kohinoor Sen Barat as Srijan

References

External links
 

Bengali-language Indian films
2010s Bengali-language films
2015 films